Class C may refer to:
 Class C amplifier, a category of electronic amplifier
 Class C (baseball), a defunct class in minor league baseball in North America
 Class C stellar classification for a carbon star
 Class C drugs, under the Misuse of Drugs Act (disambiguation) of multiple Commonwealth Nations
 Class C drug, as defined by the UK's Misuse of Drugs Act 1971
 Class C network, a type of IP address on a Classful network
 Class C, an airspace class as defined by the ICAO
 Class C, a type of driver's license in the United States
 Class C, a large goods vehicle driving licence in the United Kingdom
 Class C, from the List of North American broadcast station classes
 Class C, a type of smooth function in mathematics
 Class C motorhome, a type of recreational vehicle which has a bed over the driver's cab

See also
 C class (disambiguation)
 C (disambiguation)
 Class (disambiguation)
 C series (disambiguation)